Churchill Davidson Russell (March 16, 1923 – March 31, 1999) was a Canadian professional ice hockey player. Russell played 90 games in the National Hockey League (NHL) for the New York Rangers over three seasons between 1945 and 1947. The rest of his career, which lasted from 1943 to 1955, was spent in various minor leagues.

Playing career
Born in Winnipeg, Manitoba, Russell played junior hockey for the Winnipeg Rangers from 1940 to 1943. In his final season, Russell helped his team win the Memorial Cup junior ice hockey championship. Russell played one season for the Victoria Navy team, then served in the military during World War II.

Upon his return in 1945, Russell was signed by the New York Rangers organization. He started with the New York Rovers but played 17 games for the Rangers in 1945–46. The following season, he played for the Rangers, scoring 20 goals and 8 assists. In 1947–48, he played only 19 games for the Rangers.

In 1947, the Rangers traded him to the Cleveland Barons for George Johnston. Russell played two seasons for the Barons, then moved on to the Pittsburgh Hornets for one season and the minor-league Vancouver Canucks for a season. He played in some playoff games the next season for the Winnipeg Maroons. He did not play for two seasons, then played a final eight games for the Brandon Wheat Kings senior ice hockey team in the 1954–55 season to finish his playing career.

Career statistics

Regular season and playoffs

Awards and achievements
 Memorial Cup Championship (1943)
 EAHL First All-Star Team (1946)
 Honoured Member of the Manitoba Hockey Hall of Fame

External links
 

1923 births
1999 deaths
Canadian expatriate ice hockey players in the United States
Canadian ice hockey left wingers
Cleveland Barons (1937–1973) players
New York Rangers players
New York Rovers players
Pittsburgh Hornets players
Ice hockey people from Winnipeg
Winnipeg Maroons players
Winnipeg Rangers players
Vancouver Canucks (WHL) players